Lake Minocqua is a freshwater natural drainage lake in northern Oneida County, Wisconsin. It is 1360 acres (5.5 km²) in area, with an average depth of 23 feet (7 m) and a maximum depth of 60 feet (18.3 m).

The name Minocqua means "noon day rest" which is translated from the Ojibwe word "Ninocqua". It resides between the towns of Minocqua and Woodruff. The area is located in the "Lakeland" area in Northern Wisconsin, and is a major tourist location. To the west Lake Minocqua is connected to Lake Kawaguesaga, both of the lakes water levels are controlled by the Minocqua Dam.

Physical aspects 
The volume of the lake is 10.2 billion us gallons (8,493,276,683 imperial gallons). The bottom sediment of the lake is composed of sand (65%), muck (16%), rock (4%), and gravel (15%). The hydrologic lake type of Lake Minocqua is drainage. The lake surrounds the town of Minocqua and there is a bridge that crosses over the lake towards its southwestern border. Water inflow to the lake through two main sources, Minocqua Thoroughfare and Tomahawk Thoroughfare. The lake flows into the Tomahawk River and other surround lakes, such as Mid Lake, with the average residence time for water in the lake being around 1.5 years. The elevation of the lake reaches . Lake Minocqua is divided into three basins (Northwest basin, Southwest basin, and East basin) and is home to multiple islands.

Water quality 
The lake is typically classified as dimictic lake.

Biological aspects

Native species 
The native fish species most common in Lake Minoqua are as follows:

 Muskellunge  (Esox masquinongy)
 Largemouth Bass (Micropterus salmoides)
 Smallmouth Bass (Micropterus dolomieu)
 Northern Pike (Esox lucius)
 Walleye (Esox lucius)

Invasive Species 
The following is a list of the most common invasive species in Lake Minocqua

Eurasian Water-Milfoil (Myriophyllum spicatum)
 Curley Leaf Pondweed (Potamogeton crispus)
 Purple Loosestrife (Lythrum salicaria L)
 Yellow Iris (Iris pseudacorus)
 Banded Mystery Snail (Viviparus georgianus)
 Chinese Mystery Snail (Cipangopaludina chinensis)
 Rusty Crayfish (Faxonius rusticus)

Environmental concerns 
Urban development of the surrounding towns of Minocqua and Woodruff has led to an impact on both the hydrology and the nutrient input of Lake Minocqua. Studies have found, through sampling sediment cores from the bottom of the lake, that since the development of the surrounding around starting around 1890, there have been increased levels of sediment and phosphorus. Stormwater runoff, commercial development and stormwater runoff are a few of the main concerns of additional nutrient sources entering the lake.

Numerous surveys were taken, following appropriate Wisconsin Department of Natural Resources guidelines to compile a list of sites around Lake Minocqua that were considered critical habitats that warrant particular management protocols to maintain. The list consist of 15 sites considered to be critical habitats.

Recreation
Lake Minocqua is part of the "Lakeland" area of Northern Wisconsin.  Included in this group of lakes is Kawaguesaga Lake, and Tomahawk Lake.  To the north is the Lac du Flambeau area, which has many small lakes, and to the east is the Eagle River, Wisconsin area.

Lake Minocqua is home to many tourist attractions including year round fishing, water sports, designated swimming beaches, and waterfront restaurants. Due to its high volume of tourists, it is an important economic aspect for the area. Snowmobiling, fishing, boating, water-skiing, and swimming and other outdoor activities bring people in from all over the nation to the many resorts and summer homes on the lake.

References

Minoqua
Tourist attractions in Oneida County, Wisconsin